Enoch Wu (born 31 December 1980) is a Taiwanese policy advocate and former special forces soldier. Wu is the founder of Forward Alliance, a Taiwanese NGO focusing on national security.

Wu was born in Chicago, Illinois. He returned to Taiwan at the age of six and grew up in Taipei before attending high school in the United States. After graduating from Yale College, he worked at Goldman Sachs in Hong Kong. In 2013, he left the finance industry to pursue public service in Taiwan.

He served in the Taiwanese Army's Special Forces Command from 2014 to 2015. Following his national service, Wu joined Premier Lin Chuan's office to lead an interagency task force on Taiwan's security policies and served on the staff of Taiwan's National Security Council.

Wu ran for a legislative seat in Taipei's 3rd District in the 2020 general election, narrowly losing to the Kuomintang (KMT) incumbent Wayne Chiang. From February 2021 to June 2022, he served as the Democratic Progressive Party (DPP)'s Taipei Chapter Chair.

In 2022, Time Magazine honored Enoch Wu in the Leaders category of the Time 100 Next, its annual global list of 100 individuals shaping the future of their fields and defining the next generation of leadership, for his work with Forward Alliance. In response, Wu shared the recognition with the volunteers, first responders, and NGOs partnered with Forward Alliance.

On December 5, 2022, Wu announced that he had married his girlfriend in October.

Early life and education 
Wu was born on December 31, 1980 in Chicago, Illinois, while his father pursued a PhD in political science at the University of Chicago. His parents, Lin Huei-ying (林惠英) and Wu Nai-teh (吳乃德) met in university. Wu's father was a researcher at Academia Sinica, the preeminent academic institution in Taiwan, where he focused on political identity and transitional justice. His mother had a career in advertising and now dedicates her time to an educational nonprofit.

Education 
Returning to Taiwan at age 6 after his father completed his PhD, Wu attended elementary and middle school in Taipei. In 1995, he moved to the United States for high school. Wu studied at high schools in Illinois and Michigan before enrolling in Phillips Exeter Academy in New Hampshire.

Wu obtained his bachelor's degree in economics from Yale College in 2003. While in college, he co-founded the Yale chapter of America Counts, a U.S. Department of Education initiative.

Family and personal life 
Wu was heavily influenced by his family and family friends' involvement in Taiwan's democratic movement. While in graduate school, his father Wu Nai-teh was an editor for dissident magazines, including Formosa Magazine (美麗島雜誌) and The Movement Magazine (新潮流雜誌), advocating for democratic reforms while Taiwan was under martial law. After obtaining his PhD and returning to Taiwan, Wu Nai-teh was refused employment for two years at Academia Sinica, the premier research academy, on the grounds of harboring "Taiwanese independence and subversive tendencies" despite unanimous faculty approval.

Civic engagement was a significant part of his upbringing. At just nine years old, Wu began joining his family in protests and citizen movements. In middle school, Wu collected signatures for a nuclear power plant referendum.

Career before politics 
After graduating from Yale College in 2003, Wu worked at Goldman Sachs in Hong Kong, primarily for the Special Situations Group, focusing on investment opportunities in Asia. In 2013, Wu left Goldman Sachs to pursue public service in Taiwan.

He served with the Taiwanese Army's Special Forces Command from 2014 to 2015. Upon completing his national service as a corporal, he worked as a freelance journalist covering defense.

Political activities

Government service 
In 2017, Wu joined the office of Premier Lin Chuan, where he led an interagency task force to review Taiwan's protective security policies for government affairs. From 2017 to 2019, Wu served on the staff of Taiwan's National Security Council, where his portfolio included homeland security and critical infrastructure protection.

2020 legislative campaign 
In the 2020 Taiwanese legislative election, Wu represented the DPP in Taipei's 3rd district against Kuomintang incumbent Chiang Wan-an.

He ran on a national security platform, calling for reforms to national service, greater investment in military education, and accountability in defense spending. Wu also advocated for the lowering of the voting age from 20 to 18.

Wu received 99,539 votes and lost the election, 45.50% to Chiang's 51.44%, nearly upsetting the incumbent in a traditionally KMT district.

2023 legislative campaign
Following Chiang's election as mayor of Taipei,  was scheduled, and Wu was named the DPP candidate for Taipei's 3rd district a second time, Taipei City Councilor  ran for the open seat as the KMT candidate. On January 8, 2023, Wu received 54,739 votes and lost the election.

Democratic Progressive Party 
From 2020 to 2021, he served as Deputy Director of the New Frontier Foundation, a think tank affiliated with the DPP. From February 2021 to June 2022, Wu served as the Chairperson of the DPP's Taipei Chapter.

Positions 
Wu believes that national service must be reformed into a whole-of-society effort. An outspoken advocate for civil defense, he believes that it requires all genders serving across all functions.

Cautioning against over-reliance on authoritarian regimes, he also promotes economic diversification and emphasizes the necessity of a collective effort by all democratic countries to counter China. Wu advocates for the creation of a regional security bloc.

Beyond security issues, Wu supports the Hong Kong democratic movement, LGBTQ+ rights, energy security, and tax reforms.

Forward Alliance 

In 2020, Wu founded Forward Alliance with the goal of improving Taiwan's national security through greater public awareness, policy advocacy, and civic participation.

Disaster response and civil defense 
To enhance civilian disaster response capabilities, Forward Alliance partners with domestic and international NGOs, including paramedic and firefighter associations.

Forward Alliance's "iCanHelp" workshops train participants in emergency first aid (with a focus on severe trauma), search and rescue, and community safety and security. Instructors come from the professional first responder community, including paramedics, firefighters, and police officers.

Wu intends for these workshops to serve a dual purpose: build up a capability that can respond to disasters in peacetime, but also form the backbone of civil defense in case of conflict.

Time 100 Next 
Recognizing his work with Forward Alliance, Time Magazine selected Enoch Wu for the 2022 Time 100 Next. Time commended, "Enoch Wu wants to give every Taiwan citizen the know-how to protect their community. As the threat level rises from Beijing…. Wu is providing civilians emergency-response training for both natural and man-made disasters." Wu extended the honor to Forward Alliance partners, including volunteers, first responders, and NGOs.

References 

Living people
1980 births
Yale College alumni
Democratic Progressive Party (Taiwan) politicians
People from Cook County, Illinois